Kevin Counihan is the former CEO of healthcare.gov. He previously headed Connecticut’s health insurance exchange.

In 2017, he joined health care insurance company Centene.

References

American health care chief executives
Living people
Year of birth missing (living people)

External links 

 Kevin Counihan at Community Health Center